Hakim Expressway starts from the junction of  Resalat Expressway and Kordestan Expressway after Resalat Tunnel and ends in Allame Jafari (Nour) Square. It is part of Resalat Expressway before renaming some parts to Hakim and Allameh Jafari.

Expressways in Tehran